HMS Prince Consort was the first ship to carry this name in the Royal Navy.  Laid down as HMS Triumph, at HM Royal Dockyard, Pembroke as a 91-gun screw second-rate line-of-battle ship, she was renamed HMS Prince Consort on 14 February 1862 following the death of Prince Albert of Saxe-Coburg and Gotha, the husband of Queen Victoria.

Her first posting after commissioning was to Liverpool; on her passage there, in an Irish Sea gale, it was found that she did not have enough scuppers fitted to discharge seawater coming aboard, and almost foundered. She served in the Channel Fleet from 1864 until 1867, when she was paid off to re-arm. From 1867 to 1871 she formed part of the Mediterranean Fleet, until she was brought home for a further re-armament. Notwithstanding this expense, she saw no further sea service, and by 1882 had fallen into disrepair, and was sold.

The "Prince Consort" brought passengers to Queensland (Australia) on 26 July 1862, 2 November 1862, 22 December 1863 and 30 March 1864, sailing from the English ports of  Liverpool, Plymouth and Southampton.

Footnotes

References
 

 
  (E-Book References – Due to the page numbers being variable, only the Chapter or Section of the book will be listed)

 

Bulwark-class battleships (1859)
Prince Consort-class ironclads
Ships built in Pembroke Dock
1864 ships
Victorian-era battleships of the United Kingdom
Maritime incidents in October 1863
Maritime incidents in November 1869